Guam Soccer League (GSL) is the men's top level professional football league of the Guam Football Association in the United States territory of Guam. Since 2004, the GSL has had two levels,  Division 1 and Division 2.  Since 2007, the league has adopted a longer season that starts in the fall and ends in the spring. Previously the GSL was divided into Spring and Fall seasons. When the champions of both seasons were different, a one-off match was played to decide the year's overall champion.

2018-19 league table

The final standings of the 2018-19 season.

Teams for 2017–18 season

Premier Division
 Anderson Bombers
 Bank of Guam B
 Bank of Guam Strykers FC
 Bobcat Rovers
 Crushers FC
 EuroCar FC
 FC Beercelona
 Familia FC
 Isla De Ladrones
 Islanders FC
 LOH Heat
 Pago Bay Disasters
 Quality Distributors
 Rovers FC
 Shipyard HAYA
 Sidekicks FC
 U.O.G. Tritons

Masters Division
 Big Blue
 Gino's FC
 Hyundai Family FC
 IT&E Boonie Dawgs
 NAPA Rovers II
 United Masters

Previous winners
Winners were: 

 1990: University of Guam
 1991: University of Guam
 1992: University of Guam
 1993: University of Guam
 1994: Tumon Taivon (Tamuning)
 1995: G-Force (Continental Micronesia)
 1996: G-Force
 1997: Tumon Soccer Club
 1998 Overall: Anderson Soccer Club
 1998 Spring: Anderson Soccer Club
 1998 Fall: Island Cargo
 1999 Overall: Coors Light Silver Bullets
 1999 Spring: Carpet One
 1999 Fall: Coors Light Silver Bullets
 2000 Overall: Coors Light Silver Bullets
 2000 Spring: Coors Light Silver Bullets
 2000 Fall: Navy
 2001 Overall: Staywell Zoom
 2001 Spring: Coors Light Silver Bullets
 2001 Fall : Staywell Zoom
 2002 Overall: Guam Shipyard
 2002 Spring : Guam Shipyard
 2002 Fall: Guam Shipyard
 2003 Overall: Guam Shipyard
 2003 Spring : Guam Shipyard
 2003 Fall: Guam Shipyard
 2004 Overall: Guam U18
 2004 Spring : Guam U18
 2004 Fall: Guam U18
 2005 Overall: Guam Shipyard
 2005 Spring: Guam Shipyard
 2005 Fall: Guam Shipyard
 2006 Overall: Guam Shipyard
 2006 Spring: Guam Shipyard
 2006 Fall: Guam Shipyard
 2007 Spring: Quality Distributors
 2007/08: Quality Distributors
 2008/09: Quality Distributors
 2009/10: Quality Distributors
 2010/11: Cars Plus FC
 2011/12: Quality Distributors
 2012/13: Quality Distributors
 2013/14: Rovers FC
 2014/15: Rovers FC
 2015/16: Rovers FC
 2016/17: Rovers FC
 2017/18: Rovers FC
 2018/19: Rovers FC
 2019/20: Season cancelled due to COVID-19 pandemic in Guam
 2020/21: No season

Total championships
The number of league championships that clubs in Guam have attained.

Golden boot winners

References

External links
League at FIFA

 
1
Top level football leagues in Asia
Sports leagues established in 1990
1990 establishments in Guam
Professional sports leagues in the United States